WSRF (1580 AM) is a radio station broadcasting a full-service/brokered format primarily in Haitian Creole and French. Licensed to Fort Lauderdale, Florida, United States, the station serves the Miami area.  The station is owned by Niche Radio, Inc.

WSRF is one of several stations broadcasting its signal using CAM-D, a digital transmission method similar to HD Radio, but compatible with many current analog receivers.

References

External links
FCC History Cards for WSRF

CAM-D-enabled radio
SRF
French-language mass media in the United States
French-language radio stations
Haitian-American culture in Florida
Haitian Creole-language mass media
SRF